Rokometno društvo Rudar Trbovlje, commonly referred to as RD Rudar Trbovlje or simply Rudar, is a handball club from Trbovlje, Slovenia.

References

External links
Official website 

Handball clubs established in 1952
Handball clubs established in 2009
Slovenian handball clubs
1952 establishments in Slovenia
2009 establishments in Slovenia
Trbovlje